Hélène Cardona is a poet, linguist, literary translator and actor. She was born in Paris, the daughter of Spanish poet Jose Manuel Cardona, from Ibiza, and a Greek mother. She is a citizen of the United States, France and Spain.

She studied in the University of Cantabria, Spain and in the Sorbonne in Paris, gaining a master's degree in American Literature. She has received fellowships from the Goethe-Institut and the International University of Andalucía.

Cardona has worked as a translator for the French Chamber of Commerce, the Canadian Embassy, and for the film industry. her book Life in Suspension won the 2017 International Book Award in Poetry.

She played the part of Françoise "Fuffi" Drou, the beauty shop proprietor in the film Chocolat.

Works
She is author of:
 Dreaming My Animal Selves (Bilingual English/French)
 The Astonished Universe/ L'Univers Stupefait
 Life in Suspension

She has translated:
 José Manuel Cardona’s Birnam Wood/ El Bosque de Birnam (Bilingual English/Spanish)
 Gabriel Arnou-Laujeac’s Beyond Elsewhere
 Dorianne Laux’s Ce que nous portons
 Walt Whitman’s Civil War Writings (Whitman et la Guerre de Sécession)

Awards
2022 Cult Critic Movie Awards

References

External links

French women poets
French translators
Living people
People from Paris
Year of birth missing (living people)
French people of Spanish descent
French people of Greek descent